The Ante-Nicene Fathers, subtitled "The Writings of the Fathers Down to A.D. 325", is a collection of books in 10 volumes (one volume is indexes) containing English translations of the majority of Early Christian writings.  The period covers the beginning of Christianity until the promulgation of the Nicene Creed at the First Council of Nicaea.

Publication

The series was originally published between 1867 and 1873 by the Presbyterian publishing house T. & T. Clark in Edinburgh under the title Ante-Nicene Christian Library (ANCL), as a response to the Oxford movement's Library of the Fathers which was perceived as too strongly identified with the Anglo-Catholic movement.  The volumes were edited by Rev. Alexander Roberts and James Donaldson.  This series was available by subscription, but the editors were unable to interest enough subscribers to commission a translation of the homilies of Origen.

In 1885 the Christian Literature Company, first of Buffalo, then New York, began to issue the volumes in a reorganized form.  This was done without permission, and was indeed a pirate edition.  The new series was edited by the Episcopal bishop of New York, A. Cleveland Coxe. Coxe gave his series the title The Ante-Nicene Fathers. By 1896, this American edition/revision was complete.  Unable to close down the pirate, T. & T. Clark were obliged to make what terms they could.

In 1897, a volume 9, which contained new translations, was published by T. & T. Clark as an additional volume, to complete the original ANCL. Apart from volume 9, the contents entirely derived from the ANCL, but in a more chronological order.  Coxe added his own introductions and notes, which were criticized by academic authorities and Roman Catholic reviewers.

T. & T. Clark then associated with the Christian Literature Company and with other American publisher for the publication of the Nicene and Post-Nicene Fathers.

See also

Nicene and Post-Nicene Fathers
Ancient Christian Writers
Jacques Paul Migne

External links

 

1867 books
1885 books
Publications of patristic texts
Translations into English
Book series introduced in 1885
Christian law